Al Parish (born in the late-1950s) is a former Charleston Southern University economist, who was sentenced to federal prison after pleading guilty to financial fraud. Nearly 300 people lost up to $66 million invested in Parish Economic's private investment funds. Before being charged with fraud, Parish was known as a flamboyant local financial expert dubbed 'Economan', and was known for his $1.2 million pen collection, including a $170,000 diamond-encrusted pen.  Included in the fraud was over $4 Million set aside for Athletic Facilities improvements at Charleston Southern University.

He began serving a 24-year sentence in the summer of 2008 after pleading guilty to orchestrating a Ponzi scheme, and was ordered to pay restitution of $66.8 million. Investigators believe they will recover $9–15 million for investors, but the investigation has cost more than $2 million.

He served his sentence at Butner Federal Correctional Complex outside of Raleigh, North Carolina along with inmates such as Bernard Madoff.

After serving about half his sentence, Parish was granted a "compassionate release" on March 17, 2021, due to  a number of chronic health conditions and the risk of severe illness from coronavirus, according to an order by U.S. District Judge Richard Gergel.

Al Parish was released from federal prison on March 24, 2021. Records show Parish first filed his motion for compassionate release on April 10, 2020, saying the combined risk of COVID-19 and his chronic medical conditions, constituted extraordinary and compelling reasons for compassionate release.
Initially, the request was denied – the court stating his chronic medical conditions did not meet the threshold requirements for compassionate release.

Parish moved for reconsideration and reported he had contracted the COVID-19 virus. After some back-and-forth, and discovering he was suffering from Stage 3B chronic kidney disease, the court later reversed its decision and allowed the release.

References

External links
Parish Economics website in June 2006, featuring the 'Economan' cartoon.

1950s births
American fraudsters
21st-century American economists
Charleston Southern University people
Prisoners and detainees of the United States federal government
Living people
Crimes in South Carolina